Roda Impian (English: Dream Wheel) was the Malaysian version of Wheel Of Fortune which was aired on Astro Ria between 1996 and 2006. The game show was also aired on NTV7 in 1999. On TV3, the Astro Ria version was aired on a one-week delay in the early 2000s and later as a self programme produced by Filem Karya Nusa in 2009. It was the longest running and most watched game show in Malaysia until its end in 2006 due to Hani Mohsin's death from a sudden heart attack.

It returned in 2009 as a self programme produced by Filem Karya Nusa, hosted by Kieran on TV3. The show is on indefinite hiatus as of February 2010 since that brief run.

Format 

see: Wheel Of Fortune''

Hosts

References

1996 Malaysian television series debuts
2006 Malaysian television series endings
2009 Malaysian television series debuts
2009 Malaysian television series endings
1990s Malaysian television series
2000s Malaysian television series
Malaysian game shows
Roulette and wheel games
Wheel of Fortune (franchise)
Non-American television series based on American television series
Astro Ria original programming